Camalote is a village located along the George Price Highway in Cayo District, Belize. It lies approximately five kilometers west of Belmopan. According to the 2010 census, Camalote has a population of 2,562 people in 560 households.

References 

Populated places in Cayo District
Cayo South